Pakistan's climate is a continental type of climate, characterized by extreme variations in temperature, both seasonally and daily, because it is located on a great landmass north of the Tropic of Cancer (between latitudes 25° and 37° N).

Very high altitudes modify the climate in the cold, snow-covered northern mountains; temperatures on the Balochistan plateau are somewhat higher. Along the coastal strip, the climate is modified by sea breeze. During summer, hot winds called Loo blow across the plains during the day. Trees shed their leaves to avoid loss of moisture. Pakistan recorded one of the highest temperatures in the world, 53.7 °C (128.66 °F) on 28 May 2017, the hottest temperature ever recorded in Pakistan and also the second hottest measured temperature ever recorded in Asia.

The dry, hot weather is broken occasionally by dust storms and thunderstorms that temporarily lower the temperature.

Climate geography 

The monsoon and the Western Disturbance are the two main factors which alter the weather over Pakistan; Continental air prevails for the rest of the year. Following are the main factors that influence the weather over Pakistan.

Western Disturbances mostly occur during the winter months and cause light to moderate showers in southern parts of the country while moderate to heavy showers with heavy snowfall in the northern parts of the country. These westerly waves are robbed of most of the moisture by the time they reach Pakistan.
Fog  occurs during the winter season and remains for weeks in upper Sindh, central Khyber Pakhtunkhwa and  Punjab.
Southwest Monsoon occurs in summer from the month of June till September in almost whole Pakistan excluding western Balochistan, FATA, Chitral and Gilgit–Baltistan. Monsoon rains bring much awaited relief from the scorching summer heat. These monsoon rains are quite heavy by nature and can cause significant flooding, even severe flooding if they interact with westerly waves in the upper parts of the country.
Tropical Storms usually form during the summer months from late April till June and then from late September till November. They affect the coastal localities of the country.
Dust storms occur during summer months with peak in May and June, They are locally known as Andhi. These dust storms are quite violent. Dust storms during the early summer indicate the arrival of the monsoons while dust storms in the autumn indicate the arrival of winter.
Heat waves occur during May and June, especially in southern Punjab, central Balochistan and Sindh.
Thunderstorms most commonly occur in northern Punjab, Khyber Pakhtunkhwa and Azad Kashmir.
Continental air prevails during the period when there is no precipitation in the country.

Pakistan has four seasons: a cool, dry winter from December through February; a hot, dry spring from March through May; the summer rainy season, or southwest monsoon period, from June through September; and the retreating monsoon period of October and November. The onset and duration of these seasons vary somewhat according to location.

The climate in the capital city of Islamabad varies from an average daily low of 2 °C in January to an average daily high of 38 °C in June. Half of the annual rainfall occurs in July and August, averaging about 255 millimeters in each of those two months. The remainder of the year has significantly less rain, amounting to about fifty millimeters per month. Hailstorms are common in the spring.

Pakistan's largest city, Karachi, which is also the country's industrial center, is more humid than Islamabad but gets less rain. Only July and August average more than twenty-five millimeters of rain in the Karachi area; the remaining months are exceedingly dry. The temperature is also more uniform in Karachi than in Islamabad, ranging from an average daily low of 13 °C during winter evenings to an average daily high of 34 °C on summer days. Although the summer temperatures do not get as high as those in Punjab, the high humidity causes the residents a great deal of discomfort. In Islamabad, there are cold winds from the north of Pakistan.

Nobody was ever recorded in Pakistan in 2022 °C (128.66 °F), in Turbat, Balochistan on 28 May 2017. It was not only the hottest temperature ever recorded in Pakistan but also the second verified hottest temperature ever recorded in Asia and the fourth highest temperature ever recorded on earth. The record-breaking rain fell in just 10 hours. It was the heaviest rainfall in Islamabad in the previous 100 years.

Tropical cyclones and tornadoes

Each year before the onset of monsoon that is 15 April to 15 July and also after its withdrawal that is 15 September to 15 December, there is always a distinct possibility of the cyclonic storm to develop in the north Arabian Sea. Cyclones form in the Arabian sea often results in strong winds and heavy rainfall in Pakistan's coastal areas. However tornadoes mostly occur during spring season that is March and April usually when a Western Disturbance starts effecting the northern parts of the country. It is also speculated that cycles of tornado years may be correlated to the periods of reduced tropical cyclone activity.

Drought

The drought has become a frequent phenomenon in the country. Already, the massive droughts of 1998-2002 has stretched the coping abilities of the existing systems to the limit and it has barely been able to check the situation from becoming a catastrophe. The drought of 1998-2002 is considered the worst drought in 50 years. According to the Economic Survey of Pakistan, the drought was one of the most significant factors responsible for the less than anticipated growth performance. The survey terms it as the worst drought in the history of the country. According to the government, 40 percent of the country's water needs went unmet.

Floods

Pakistan has seen many floods, the worst and most destructive is the recent 2010 Pakistan floods, other floods which caused destruction in the history of Pakistan, include the flood of 1950, which killed 2910 people; on 1 July 1977 heavy rains and flooding in Karachi, killed 248 people, according to Pakistan meteorological department  of rain fell in 24 hours. In 1992 flooding during Monsoon season killed 1,834 people across the country, in 1993 flooding during Monsoon rains killed 3,084 people, in 2003 Sindh province was badly affected due to monsoon rains causing damages in billions, killed 178 people, while in 2007 Cyclone Yemyin submerged lower part of Balochistan Province in sea water killing 380 people. Before that it killed 213 people in Karachi on its way to Balochistan.

2010 Floods

2010 July floods swept 20% of Pakistan's land, the flood is the result of unprecedented Monsoon rains which lasted from 28 July to 31 July 2010. Khyber Pakhtunkhwa and North eastern Punjab were badly affected during the monsoon rains when dams, rivers and lakes overflowed. By mid-August, according to the governmental Federal Flood Commission (FFC), the floods had caused the deaths of at least 1,540 people, while 2,088 people had received injuries, 557,226 houses had been destroyed, and over 6 million people had been displaced. One month later, the data had been updated to reveal 1,781 deaths, 2,966 people with injuries, and more than 1.89 million homes destroyed. The flood affected more than 20 million people exceeding the combined total of individuals affected by the 2004 Indian Ocean tsunami, the 2005 Kashmir earthquake and the 2010 Haiti earthquake. The flood is considered as worst in Pakistan's history affecting people of all four provinces and Gilgit–Baltistan and Azad Kashmir region of Pakistan.

2011 Sindh floods

The 2011 Sindh floods began during the monsoon season in mid-August 2011, resulting from heavy monsoon rains in Sindh, Eastern Balochistan, and Southern Punjab. The floods have caused considerable damage; an estimated 270 civilians have been killed, with 5.3 million people and 1.2 million homes affected. Sindh is a fertile region and often called the "breadbasket" of the country; the damage and toll of the floods on the local agrarian economy is said to be extensive. At least 1.7 million acres of arable land has been inundated as a result of the flooding. The flooding has been described as the worst since the 2010 Pakistan floods, which devastated the entire country. Unprecedented torrential monsoon rains caused severe flooding in 16 districts of Sindh province.

2022 floods 

Since June 2022, floods caused by monsoon rains and melting glaciers in Pakistan particularly in the southern regions of Sindh and Balochistan in the have killed at least 1,128 people, including 340 children and six military officers in a helicopter crash, with over 1,700 more injured. It is the world's deadliest flood since 2017. On 25 August, Pakistan declared a state of emergency because of the flooding.

Extreme temperatures

Climate change

See also

 Climate of Islamabad   
 Climate of Karachi
 Climate of Lahore
 Climate of Faisalabad
 Climate of Rawalpindi
 Climate of Peshawar
 Climate of Quetta
 Climate of Multan
 Climate of Hyderabad
 Climate of Nawabshah
 Climate of Gwadar

References

 
Pakistan